John Kirk may refer to:

Military
John Kirk (soldier) (1827–1865), awarded the Victoria Cross
John Kirk (Medal of Honor), American Indian Wars soldier on List of Medal of Honor recipients for the Indian Wars

Sportspeople
John Kirk (footballer, born 1922) (1922–?), English football winger with Darlington
John Kirk (footballer, born 1930), Canadian football inside forward with Accrington Stanley
John Kirk (cyclist) (1890–1951), British Olympic cyclist

Politicians
John Kirk (New Zealand politician) (born 1947)
John Angus Kirk (1837–1910), Canadian politician and farmer
John P. Kirk (1867–1952), American politician, mayor of Ypsilanti, Michigan

Others
John Kirk (antiquarian) (1760–1851), Roman Catholic priest and antiquary
John Kirk (explorer) (1832–1922), worked alongside David Livingstone in southern Africa
John Foster Kirk (1824–1904), American historian, journalist, educator and bibliographer
John Kirk (archaeologist) (1869–1940), British twentieth-century archaeologist